This is a list of micropolitan statistical areas of Indiana.  As defined by the United States Census Bureau, a micropolitan area is the area (usually a county or grouping of counties) surrounding and including a core city with population between 10,000 and 49,999 (inclusive).  Suburbs of metropolitan areas are generally not considered to be micropolitan core cities, although they can be if they are in another county from the metropolitan core.  2004 population estimates are included for each city and its corresponding micropolitan statistical area.

See also
 List of cities in Indiana
 List of towns in Indiana
 List of metropolitan areas in Indiana
 List of census-designated places in Indiana
 List of micropolitan statistical areas by state

References

 
Micropolitan areas